Durfort (Languedocien: Durfòrt) is a commune in the Tarn department in southern France.

It is located Between Revel, Haute-Garonne and Sorèze, Tarn.  It borders the shores of the Sor river, which leads to Montagne Noir (the Black Mountain). The town gave its name to the great Durfort family, which is distinguished in French and English history

Durfort is nicknamed Cité du Cuivre (the copper city), for the prosperous copper artisan trade that exists there, in addition to artisan trades in leather, glass, basket-making and jewelry.

Durfort is home to Musée du Cuivre (the copper museum), established in 1986, to document five centuries of the local copper craft.

Durfort hosts its annual water festival every August.  An ever evolving expression of creative ideas and community spirit

During August Silksart - http://silksart.co.uk/ - works and runs workshops in the studio on Rue des Martineurs producing contemporary abstract art and bespoke clothing.

See also
Communes of the Tarn department

References

External links

 official website (French)

Communes of Tarn (department)